Ratajski (feminine Ratajska) is a Polish surname. Notable people include:

 Cyryl Ratajski, Polish politician and lawyer
 Krzysztof Ratajski, Polish darts player
 Sławomir Ratajski, Polish painter and diplomat

See also 
 Rataj, Ratajczak

Polish-language surnames